Fox Farm site may refer to:

Fox Farm site (Mays Lick, Kentucky) near Mays Lick, Kentucky, NRHP-listed
Fox Farm site (McMullin, Virginia), listed on the NRHP in Smyth County, Virginia